Sylvia Is! is an album by vocalist Sylvia Syms with guitarist Kenny Burrell recorded in 1965 and released on the Prestige label.

Reception

Allmusic awarded the album 3 stars stating "Sylvia Syms was one of the top cabaret singers, uplifting a wide variety of interesting songs throughout her career... because Syms does not improvise, this CD reissue is more for fans of cabaret than for followers of jazz".

Track listing 
 "As Long as I Live" (Harold Arlen, Ted Koehler) – 3:04   
 "More Than You Know" (Edward Eliscu, Billy Rose, Vincent Youmans) – 4:02   
 "(I'm Afraid) The Masquerade Is Over" (Herb Magidson, Allie Wrubel) – 3:12   
 "How Insensitive" (Norman Gimbel, Antônio Carlos Jobim) – 3:51   
 "Smile" (Charlie Chaplin) – 3:43   
 "If You Could See Me Now" (Tadd Dameron, Carl Sigman) – 3:34   
 "Meditation" (Gimbel, Jobim) – 3:21   
 "Cuando Te Fuiste de Mi" (Robert Lee Manrique) – 3:54   
 "God Bless the Child" (Billie Holiday, Arthur Herzog, Jr.) – 2:55   
 "Wild Is the Wind" (Dimitri Tiomkin, Ned Washington) – 3:04   
 "You Are Always in My Heart" (Ernesto Lecuona, Kim Gannon) – 3:48   
 "Brazil" (Ary Barroso, Bob Russell) – 2:53  
Recorded at Van Gelder Studio in Englrewood Cliffs, New Jersey on August 11, 1965 (tracks 1–3, 5, 6 & 9) – and August 13, 1965 (tracks 4, 7, 8 & 10–12)

Personnel 
Sylvia Syms – vocals
Kenny Burrell – guitar
Milt Hinton – bass
Osie Johnson – drums
Bucky Pizzarelli – guitar (tracks 4, 7, 8 & 10–12)
Willie Rodriguez – percussion (tracks 4, 7, 8 & 10–12)

References 

1965 albums
Prestige Records albums
Sylvia Syms (singer) albums
Kenny Burrell albums
Albums recorded at Van Gelder Studio
Albums produced by Cal Lampley